Orlovka is a rural locality (a selo) and the administrative center of Orlovskoye Rural Settlement, Talovsky District, Voronezh Oblast, Russia. The population was 996 as of 2010. There are 3 streets.

Geography 
Orlovka is located on the Chigla River, 20 km southwest of Talovaya (the district's administrative centre) by road. Ozerki is the nearest rural locality.

References 

Rural localities in Talovsky District